Kathi Appelt (born July 6, 1954) is an American author of more than forty books for children and young adults. She won the annual PEN USA award for Children's Literature recognizing The Underneath (2008).

Biography

Kathi Appelt was born in Fayetteville, North Carolina, and grew up in Houston, Texas. She graduated from Texas A&M University and lives in College Station, Texas.

Appelt is the author of more than 30 books. She writes novels, picture books, poetry, and nonfiction for children and young adults. Her books have been translated into several languages: Spanish, Chinese, French, and Swedish.

Her first novel was The Underneath, illustrated by David Small and published by Simon & Schuster in 2008. It features a cat and dog who live mainly beneath an old house in the Louisiana–Texas bayou. For that work she received the annual Children's Literature award from PEN Center USA and she was also a runner-up for the National Book Award (National Book Award for Young People's Literature finalist) and the American Library Association Newbery Medal (Newbery Honor Book).

Her papers are held in the de Grummond Children's Literature Collection at the University of Southern Mississippi (unprocessed manuscripts collection, 1985–2005).

Selected works
 The Underneath, illustrated by David Small (Simon & Schuster, 2008)
 Brand-New Baby Blues, illustrated by Kelly Murphy (HarperCollins, 2009)
 Keeper, illus. August Hall (Atheneum Books, 2010)
 Down Cut Shin Creek: The Pack Horse Librarians of Kentucky, co-authored by Jeanne Cannella Schmitzer (HarperCollins, 2001; Purple House Press 2019)
 Max Attacks, illus. Penelope Dullaghan (Atheneum Books for Young Readers, 2019)

References

External links

 
 
 

1954 births
American children's writers
Newbery Honor winners
People from Fayetteville, North Carolina
Texas A&M University alumni
Vermont College of Fine Arts faculty
Living people
21st-century American novelists
21st-century American women writers
American women children's writers
American women novelists
Novelists from Vermont
American women academics